Anthony Randolph "A. J." Lawson (born July 15, 2000) is a Canadian professional basketball player for the Dallas Mavericks of the National Basketball Association (NBA), on a two-way contract with the Texas Legends of the NBA G League. He played college basketball for the South Carolina Gamecocks.

Early life and high school career
Lawson grew up in Brampton, Ontario and attended GTA Prep in Mississauga, a basketball academy based out of Mississauga Secondary School where he was coached by David Cooper. In his senior season, Lawson was named an National Preparatory Association First Team All-Star and led the team to second place in the NPA championships. Originally set to graduate in 2019 and ranked 40th in his class by 247Sports as well as fourth-best Canadian prospect by North Pole Hoops, Lawson reclassified for the class of 2018. Lawson committed to playing college basketball for South Carolina over offers from Tulane and Creighton. South Carolina head coach Frank Martin began recruiting Lawson after a late night workout in Columbia on the trip back from a tournament.

College career

Lawson averaged 13.4 points, 4.3 rebounds and 2.9 assists per game in 29 games played and was named to the Southeastern Conference (SEC) All-Freshman team. He was named the SEC Freshman of the Week on November 19, 2018 after averaging 15.7 points, 6.3 rebounds and 5.3 assists over a three-game stretch against Norfolk State, Providence and George Washington. Following the season he initially entered his name into the 2019 NBA draft, but decided to withdraw and return to South Carolina for his sophomore season.

Lawson was named to the preseason first team All-SEC and to the Jerry West Award watchlist going into his sophomore year. He was also named the 41st-best collegiate basketball player going into the 2019–20 season by CBS Sports and the 29th-best prospect for the 2020 NBA draft by ESPN. Lawson scored a season-high 28 points on November 15, 2019 in a 90–63 win against Cleveland State. Lawson led the team during the season in total points with 416 and points per game at 13.4 while also averaging 3.7 rebounds, 1.9 assists and 1.2 steals per game. Following the season, he declared for the 2020 NBA draft but did not hire an agent. Lawson decided to withdraw from the draft and return to South Carolina on July 29. On January 6, 2021, Lawson scored a career-high 30 points in a 78–54 win over Texas A&M. As a junior, he averaged 16.6 points, 4.1 rebounds, 1.2 assists and 1.5 steals per game. He was named to the Southeastern Conference (SEC) All-Second Team. On April 19, 2021, he declared for the 2021 NBA draft and signed an agent.

Professional career

College Park Skyhawks (2021–2022)
After going undrafted in the 2021 NBA draft, Lawson joined the Miami Heat and Atlanta Hawks for the 2021 NBA Summer League. On September 22, 2021, Lawson signed with the Atlanta Hawks. However, he was waived on October 7. In October 2021, Lawson signed with the College Park Skyhawks where he played 26 games and averaged 11.8 points, 6.3 rebounds and 1.3 steals per game, while shooting 48.1% from the field.

Guelph Nighthawks (2022)
On April 26, 2022, Lawson signed with the Guelph Nighthawks of the CEBL.

Minnesota Timberwolves / Return to College Park (2022)
Lawson joined the Dallas Mavericks for the 2022 NBA Summer League. In five games, he averaged 15.6 points and 6.0 rebounds, while shooting 51.9% from the field. Later, on July 19, 2022, Lawson signed a two-way contract with the Minnesota Timberwolves. On October 15, 2022, Lawson was waived by the Timberwolves. On November 3, 2022, Lawson was named to the opening night roster for the College Park Skyhawks. On November 16, Lawson signed another two-way contract with the Timberwolves, but was waived on December 8. Two days later, he returned to College Park.

Dallas Mavericks (2022–present)
On December 26, 2022, Lawson signed a two-way contract with the Dallas Mavericks, splitting time with their NBA G League affiliate, the Texas Legends.

National team career
Lawson has competed internationally for the Canada men's national under-19 basketball team. He averaged 14.8 points, 5.4 rebounds and 1.2 assists per game in the 2018 FIBA Under-18 Americas Championship as Canada finished second in the tournament. Lawson posted team highs with 18 points and 12 rebounds in Canada's 113–74 loss to the United States in the tournament final.

In the 2019 FIBA Under-19 Basketball World Cup, Lawson averaged a team-best 16.7 points with 3.9 rebounds and 3.4 assists per game in seven games as Canada advanced to the quarterfinals. He also had the highest scoring performance of the tournament with a 31-point game against Senegal.

Lawson made his debut with Canada's senior men's national team during the first round of the FIBA Basketball World Cup 2023 Americas Qualifiers.

Career statistics

NBA

|-
| style="text-align:left;"|
| style="text-align:left;"|Minnesota
| 1 || 0 || 1.8 || 1.000 ||  ||  || 1.0 || .0 || .0 || .0 || 2.0
|- class="sortbottom"
| style="text-align:center;" colspan="2"|Career
| 1 || 0 || 1.8 || 1.000 ||  ||  || 1.0 || .0 || .0 || .0 || 2.0

College

|-
| style="text-align:left;"| 2018–19
| style="text-align:left;"| South Carolina
| 29 || 28 || 29.9 || .411 || .358 || .667 || 4.3 || 2.9 || 1.1 || .2 || 13.4
|-
| style="text-align:left;"| 2019–20
| style="text-align:left;"| South Carolina
| 31 || 31 || 29.1 || .414 || .339 || .724 || 3.7 || 1.9 || 1.2 || .1 || 13.4
|-
| style="text-align:left;"| 2020–21
| style="text-align:left;"| South Carolina
| 21 || 21 || 31.3 || .394 || .351 || .700 || 4.1 || 1.2 || 1.5 || .1 || 16.6
|- class="sortbottom"
| style="text-align:center;" colspan="2"| Career
| 81 || 80 || 30.0 || .407 || .349 || .697 || 4.0 || 2.1 || 1.2 || .2 || 14.2

References

External links
South Carolina Gamecocks bio
RealGM profile
 

2000 births
Living people
Basketball players from Toronto
Black Canadian basketball players
Canadian expatriate basketball people in the United States
Canadian men's basketball players
College Park Skyhawks players
Dallas Mavericks players
Guelph Nighthawks players
Iowa Wolves players
Minnesota Timberwolves players
Shooting guards
South Carolina Gamecocks men's basketball players
Sportspeople from Brampton
Undrafted National Basketball Association players